Scrag end is a cut of lamb and mutton taken from the neck and common in the United Kingdom and the Commonwealth. It is a primal cut separated from the carcass during butchering.

Value
Scrag end is one of the cheaper cuts of meat, and is often used in soups and stews.
In the United States, scrag end is known as the neck. Unlike scrag end, cutlets come from the part of the neck considered best, known as the middle neck.

References

Cuts of lamb